Sir Robert Bradshaigh, 3rd Baronet (1675–1747) of Haigh Hall near Wigan was an English landowner and  Tory politician who sat in the English House of Commons and British House of Commons for 52 years from 1695 to 1747.

Bradshaigh was the eldest son of Sir Roger Bradshaigh, 2nd Baronet of Haigh and his wife Mary Murray, daughter of Henry Murray of Berkhamsted, Hertfordshire and was baptized on 29 April 1675. He was educated privately under Mr Francis and at Ruthin School. He succeeded his father to Haigh Hall and the baronetcy on 17 June 1687.

Bradshaigh was returned as Member of Parliament for Wigan at the  1695 English general election. He sat until 1747 and was Father of the House of Commons from 1738 to 1747.

He was Mayor of Wigan for 1698, 1703, 1719, 1724 and 1729.

He married, in 1697, Rachel, the daughter of Sir John Guise, 2nd Baronet, M.P., of Elmore, Gloucestershire and had 4 sons and 2 daughters. In 1742 he handed over Haigh Hall to his eldest son Sir Roger Bradshaigh, 4th Baronet and died in 1747.

References

1675 births
1747 deaths
People from Wigan
Mayors of Wigan
English MPs 1695–1698
English MPs 1698–1700
English MPs 1701–1702
English MPs 1702–1705
English MPs 1705–1707
Tory members of the Parliament of Great Britain
Members of the Parliament of Great Britain for English constituencies
British MPs 1707–1708
British MPs 1708–1710
British MPs 1710–1713
British MPs 1713–1715
British MPs 1715–1722
British MPs 1722–1727
British MPs 1727–1734
British MPs 1734–1741
British MPs 1741–1747
Lancashire Militia officers
Hulme Trust